Burkhan may refer to:

Places
Burkhan Khaldun, one of the Khentii Mountains in the Khentii Province of northeastern Mongolia
Burkhan Bakshin Altan Sume, "The Golden Abode of the Buddha Shakyamuni" in Elista, Republic of Kalmykia, a federal subject of the Russian Federation
Burkhan Buudai, a mountain of the Gobi-Altai Mountains and located in the Govi-Altai Province in Mongolia

Others
Burkhanism or Ak Jang, a new religious movement that flourished among the indigenous people of Russia's Gorno Altai region (okrug) between 1904 and the 1930s

See also
Burhan, an Arabic male name

ru:Бурхан